Moseley Bog and Joy's Wood Local Nature Reserve, formerly The Dell, is a Local Nature Reserve in the Moseley area of Birmingham, England, with an area of about 12 ha (29 acres).

History
There are burnt mounds on the banks of the Coldbath Brook, which runs through the bog, dating back to the Bronze Age, which, with their surrounding areas, are Scheduled Ancient Monuments.

The bog was once a secondary reservoir to feed the millpond of Sarehole Mill. Although now drained, the embankment on its eastern side remains. The Coldbath Brook flows from Coldbath Pool through a culvert, through the Bog as an open stream, and is then culverted to the millpond, from whence it flows to its confluence with the River Cole. The western half of the current nature reserve had been used by Birmingham City Council as a landfill site from the 1930s to the 1960s, when it was levelled off and converted into a playing field for the nearby Moseley Grammar School. Always damp and unsuitable, from the 1980s it has been allowed to revert to natural woodland. The eastern half of the site was not affected by the landfill.

The first ever International Dawn Chorus Day event was held there in 1984, by the Urban Wildlife Trust.

The whole site was declared a Local Nature Reserve (LNR) by Birmingham City Council on 17 July 1991. Much of the area comprising Moseley Bog had been declared a Site of Special Scientific Interest (SSSI) in 1980. However, following its LNR declaration and re-evaluation by English Nature the site was denotified as an SSSI on 21 July 1992, but remains a locally designated Site of Importance for Nature Conservation (SINC).

In 2000 it was formally renamed Moseley Bog and Joy's Wood Local Nature Reserve, in recognition of the work of urban conservation campaigner Joy Fifer to protect the site. Fifer led the successful "Save Our Bog" campaign in 1980 which saved the site from development and helped kick start the Urban Wildlife movement. It was this campaign that popularised the name "Moseley Bog" for the site, which had hitherto been known as The Dell. The area now known as Joy's Wood is the former landfill part.

The Wildlife Trust for Birmingham and the Black Country now leases Moseley Bog from Birmingham City Council. In August 2006 a public consultation on proposals to conserve the site, enhance access and encourage a wider audience was launched. In March 2010, a lottery grant of £376,500 was awarded for improvements and restoration and on 26 June 2011, a formal reopening was conducted by the Lord Mayor of Birmingham, Councillor Anita Ward.

Culture
J. R. R. Tolkien lived nearby, as a child, and acknowledged the site as inspiration for the ancient forests in his books The Lord of the Rings and The Hobbit. Nearby Sarehole Mill and the surrounding area on the River Cole is said to have been inspiration for Tolkien's writings.

In 1966, in an interview for The Guardian, Tolkien said (emphasis added):

A house adjacent to the reserve (since demolished) was used by reggae band UB40 as a studio for their earliest recordings.

References

External links
Wildlife Trust pages
Birmingham City Council page on the Bog
Documentary film about a community festival that took place at Moseley Bog in 2011

Parks and open spaces in Birmingham, West Midlands
Bogs of England
Scheduled monuments in the West Midlands (county)
Local Nature Reserves in the West Midlands (county)
Moseley